This is a list of notable hairdressers. "Hairdresser" is a term referring to anyone whose occupation is to cut or style hair in order to change or maintain a person's image. This is achieved using a combination of hair coloring, haircutting, and hair texturing techniques. Most hairdressers are professionally licensed as either a barber or a cosmetologist.

Pre-20th century
Monsieur Champagne (fl. 1663) — French hairdresser, subject of the comic play Champagne le coiffeur.
Madame Martin (fl. 1671) — hairdresser to the court of Louis XIV.
 Legros de Rumigny (1710-1770) —  French court hairdresser
 Léonard (c. 1751-1820) — hairdresser to the French court.
 Marcel Grateau (1852–1936) — inventor of the Marcel wave in the 1870s, although it was most popular in the 1920s.
 Franz Ströher (1854–1936) — German hairdresser, company founder of Wella

Salon hairdressers

1900-1960
 Alexandre de Paris (1922–2008) — clients included the Duchess of Windsor and Daisy Fellowes
 Antoine de Paris (1884–1976) — Polish, began in Paris, then in New York from 1924. Introduced a short bob cut in 1909, then the shingle cut in the 1920s.
 Kenneth (1927–2013) — American, one of the foremost New York hairdressers since the 1950s, and sometimes described as the world's first celebrity hairdresser. 
 Karl Nessler (1872–1951) — German-born, worked around Europe before moving to the United States. Patented the permanent wave. 
 Teasy Weasy Raymond OBE(1911–1992) — considered Britain's first celebrity hairdresser. His clients included Diana Dors

From 1960 present
Franca Afegbua — Nigerian hairdresser and senator.
James Brown — best known for his work with Kate Moss
 Lino Carbosiero MBE London — clients include David Cameron, Catherine Zeta-Jones, Adele Adkins and Melania Trump.
 Nicky Clarke OBE London — clients include David Bowie, Elizabeth Hurley, and Diana, Princess of Wales.
 Anthony Dickey — American celebrity hairstylist known for his expertise in natural hair textures 
 Errol Douglas MBE London — clients include Diana Ross, Naomi Campbell, Melanie Griffith.
 Frédéric Fekkai — French hairstylist, particularly famous during the 1990s for his notoriously high prices.
Daniel Galvin OBE  — London Twiggy
Joshua Galvin  — London Judy Garland
 Ted Gibson — New York 
 Leonard of Mayfair — leading London hairdresser from the 1960s to 1980s, training many other cutters.
 Denise McAdam RVM — hairdresser to the current British Royal Family.
 Denis McFadden — Sydney — Founder/CEO "Just Cuts"
 Michel Mercier — French-Israeli hairdresser, his clients include Brigitte Bardot and Isabel Adjani. 
 Vidal Sassoon CBE (1928-2012) — London and later Los Angeles — clients included Mia Farrow
 Trevor Sorbie MBE — London 
 Lee Stafford — leading British hairdresser from 1998, his clients include Victoria Beckham.
 Nicolas Jurnjack (1994–present) — Leading session stylist, hairdresser in the Fashion & Beauty Industry 
 Ryan D. Michael — New York 
 Tabatha Coffey — Australian hairdresser and television personality

Film and television stylists
 Deborah Holmes Dobson — Emmy Award-winning hairstylist (Dr. Quinn, Medicine Woman)
 Sydney Guilaroff — worked for MGM on numerous movies and his clients included Greta Garbo, Grace Kelly and Joan Crawford.
Gail Ryan, American. Won Academy Award in 2011 for How The Grinch Stole Christmas. Clients include Benicio del Toro, Sean Penn, Naomi Watts, and Dustin Hoffman.

See also
 List of hairstyles

References

Lists of people by occupation
Fashion occupations
Fashion-related lists